Gatley is a suburb in the Metropolitan Borough of Stockport, Greater Manchester, England, 3 miles north-east of Manchester Airport.

History

Toponymy
Within the boundaries of the historic county of Cheshire, in 1290, Gatley was known as Gateclyve, which in Middle English means "a place where goats are kept".

Early history
Until the 20th century, most Gatley residents either worked in the material trades or were farmers. An open field system existed around Gatley in the late 17th century, but the practice of common farming seems to have fallen into disuse when William Tatton allowed tenants to buy their own land.

Gatley Carrs was the lower, marshy ground running down to the River Mersey and west to Northenden. Before 1700 it was a place for osier beds which local people had used for basket making or for wattles for cottages or fencing.

In 1800, Mr Worthington of Sharston Hall planted 1,000 poplars in Gatley Carrs. In the mid 19th century, Gatley Carrs was described as "a scene of such singular and romantic beauty, and so thoroughly unique in its composition, that we know nothing in the neighbourhood to liken it to".

Over the years Gatley Carrs has shrunk to a small part of its former size. In the second half of the 18th century, the Carrs was largely enclosed and partially drained to form farmed meadows. The Stockport to Altrincham railway line cut across it in 1864, running east–west. In 1934 house building began on "High Terrace" of the Mersey (the development behind the Horse and Farrier pub, running down to the railway line) and also about that time Cheadle and Gatley UDC purchased  to use as a refuse tip. Tree planting commenced due to complaints of smells and rats. There was loss of original field pattern because of extensive refuse tipping.

Carr Woodland was developed on what had been Carr Meadows. There was a major system of land drains identified on the 1934 map including a sluice and non-return outfall gate to protect Gatley Carr from flooding when the Mersey burst its banks.

Gatley Carrs then fell to the management of the Mersey Valley Countryside wardens until it was handed to Stockport MBC in the late 1990s.

Industrial history

Button making appears to have been a significant local trade in the 17th and 18th centuries. A "button man" (merchant selling buttons) is recorded in Gatley in the 1660s. This continued in the 18th century with three button men being mentioned in Gatley between 1735 and 1779.

People living around Gatley Green were mostly hand loom weavers and became more dependent on textile manufacture. Their cottages had cellars for storage and well-lit upper rooms for the looms.

About 1750, William Roscoe from Bolton built a factory near Gatley Hall. (This shouldn't be confused in scale with the cotton mills such as those at Styal: it appears to have been a place for hand weaving and was later converted into a farmhouse, so it was a very modest affair). Up to at least 1841, John Alcock was a textile manufacturer in Gatley, using the Roscoe factory for at least part of the period.

The spread of machinery in industrial manufacturers during the 19th century appears to have killed off industry in Gatley, before which it was a "very busy and important place, as a centre for weaving, spinning, shoemaking and fustian cutting". Handloom weaving may have survived in the area to as late as the 1880s (Melson's Directory of Cheadle, Northenden and Baguley, 1887.)

Halls and houses
In 1714, Stone Pale Hall was reconstructed in Gatley.

Gatley Hall and Gatley Hill House may both have been built in the mid-18th century by local cotton manufacturers. Gatley Hill House is now council owned (Stockport MBC) and is used by various community groups. The mansion High Grove House was built for a member of a wealthy hatting family of Yorkshire and Manchester.

Conflict
In the English Civil War (1642–51) the Tatton family, along with the local rectors and most tenants, were Royalists. Wythenshawe Hall was kept in a state of defence from 1642, with Parliamentary forces nearby in Handforth and Duckinfield. Wythenshawe Hall was taken by the Parliamentarian forces on 25 February 1644. Three Gatley men were in the garrison defending the hall: Ralphe Savage, Robert Torkinton and John Blomiley.

On 30 November 1745, about 55 Jacobite troops from Bonnie Prince Charlie's army crossed Gatley Ford and Gatley Carrs on their way to Cheadle and Stockport; the bulk of the army crossed the Mersey at Cheadle and Stockport that night and the following day. Having reached Derby but no further, the Jacobite troops were back in Stockport in the second week of December on their way back north.

Gatley residents joined the Luddite riots in 1818, but without any great distinction. They drilled in Gatley Carrs before marching to Stockport to take arms from the soldiers, but returned without actually attempting to do so. In the following summer, 1819, soldiers formed square in front of the Horse and Farrier public house in Gatley with the aim of arresting the Luddite ringleaders. Several ran away and hid (one, Isaac Legh, in the chimney of Stone Pale House, two others in the Carrs).

Religion and churches
A nonconformist meeting house registered in Etchells in 1722 may have been a house in Gatley. This house may have been in weavers cottages on Styal Road. In 1777, the Gatley Congregational Church was founded and an independent chapel was built in Old Hall Road, Gatley, following the spread of evangelicalism to nonconformist groups. A full-time minister was employed by the nonconformists for the first time. The present church is on Elm Road.

The first nonconformist minister was the Rev. Jeremiah Pendlebury, succeeded by his assistant, the Rev. Samuel Turner, in 1788. By 1860 the church congregation had fallen to eight people. Improvements made with help from the North Cheshire Rural Mission increased the congregation to 60.

Prior to 1875, Gatley's parish church was the Church of St. Thomas, four miles (6 km) away in Stockport. The people of Gatley rarely saw their parish priest, though they still had to pay their tithes.

The new church, St. James', was built of local handmade bricks and consecrated on Tuesday 6 December 1881. The Rev. Percy M. Herford was the first Vicar of St. James' Church. In 1888 the Rev. P. M. Herford left and was replaced by the Rev. John Bruster, who remained Vicar for 40 years, retiring in 1928.

The vicarage was completed in 1894, following a donation towards it of £100 from Mr W. Heald of Parrswood in 1889. The building is located a short walk away from the church on Northenden Road. The building was sold in 2007 and is now a private nursery.

Yeshurun Hebrew Congregation, a Modern Orthodox synagogue, opened in 1968.

Today, Gatley is home to three Churches, St. James' (CofE), Bethany Church (Elim Pentecostal) (Formally Gatley Christian Fellowship), and Gatley United Reformed Church (URC).

Geography
Gatley is the most westerly vicinity of the Metropolitan Borough of Stockport, and runs along the border of Stockport and Manchester. Until 1974 it was within Cheshire as a suburban township of Cheadle. It is approximately 3 miles (5 km) due northeast of Manchester Airport, 5 miles (8 km) west of Stockport town centre, 5.5 miles (9 km) east of Altrincham and 7 miles (11 km) south of Manchester city centre. It is separated from its slightly larger neighbour, Cheadle, by the A34 and from Didsbury in Manchester by the M60 motorway and the River Mersey.

To the south, Gatley borders onto Heald Green, with Grasmere Road and Yew Tree Grove marking the southern boundary. To the west and north-west, it meets Wythenshawe (part of Manchester), with roads bordering onto Hollyhedge Park (i.e. Ogden Grove, Malverne Avenue, Charnville Road, Cranston Grove, Mount Grove and 99 Altrincham Road) being the last in Gatley, and Longley Lane and the M56 motorway marking the north-western boundary.

Gatley is 130–200 feet above sea level.

Governance
Prior to 1086, Gatley was probably unpopulated and was part of Etchells (meaning "extra cleared land"). After 1086, the area was split between two landowners and for a period Gatley Brook (the old hundred boundary) formed the boundary. The halves were, at various times, held by the Stokeports and the Ardernes, then later by the Stanleys until, in 1508, the heir John Stanley was killed by a tennis ball. With no rightful claimants, the land went to the crown and, in 1556 Etchells was sold to William Tatton. By the 1560s, the Tattons, who also owned Northenden and other local land, became full lords of the manor and held court over the area.

The township of Stockport Etchells, covering Gatley and much of the area now in Heald Green (the area being based on previous ecclesiastical parishes) gained administrative responsibilities in the 16th century, as the old powers of the lord of the manor waned, and manorial rule became more by consent and custom. In the 16th, 17th and 18th centuries, Stockport Etchells and Northen Etchells were frequently administered together as Etchells.

The local court leets and court barons moved, for a time from the late 16th century, to a building that later became known as the Old Court House in Gatley  (though it was probably an inn at the time).

The townships of Stockport Etchells, Cheadle Moseley and Cheadle Bulkeley were merged into the Cheadle and Gatley Urban District in 1894. From 1894 until 1974, Gatley was a part of the urban district of Cheadle and Gatley, within the historic county boundaries of Cheshire.

In 1933–34, both Manchester and Stockport wanted to annex the Cheadle and Gatley Urban District. An opinion poll of nearly 10,000 residents recorded near-unanimous support for continuing independence.

In 1936 the boundaries of the Cheadle and Gatley Urban District saw minor changes due to the abolition of Handforth Urban District (1974–2009 Macclesfield District / Cheshire County councils. 2009 + East Cheshire Council / UA).

In 1974 the urban districts in Stockport were abolished and Cheadle and Gatley Urban District became part of the Metropolitan Borough of Stockport in Greater Manchester, though some roads in the western side of Gatley (containing around 500 homes) were a part of the City of Manchester until the early 1990s when residents launched a successful application to the Boundaries Commission to enable Gatley in its entirety to become a part of Stockport. Gatley is part of the Cheadle and Gatley borough ward and the Cheadle parliamentary constituency.

Demography
The current population of Gatley is approximately 9,000.

Historical population changes

A polished stone found in Gatley suggests some human presence in the Neolithic or early Bronze Age.

In 1286, Gatley was a hamlet within the manor of Stockport Etchells, contained at least six households (around 30 individuals): probably a significant growth from levels in the late 11th century.

An Etchells Court of Survey document, probably from the late 16th century, gives Gatley as having 16 tenants (households) including Thomas Whitelegg (the largest holding, 25 acres), Roberte Gooddyer, Arnoulde Baxter and Roger Royle.

Cheadle and Gatley Urban District saw the highest population growth of anywhere in Stockport in the inter-war period. In 1921 its population was a little over 11,000. By 1931 18,500 and by 1939, 27,000. Cheadle, Gatley and Cheadle Hulme all saw the increase, as did the previously rural area of Heald Green. This growth was largely due to people moving out of Manchester into the area.

Religion

The religious diversity in Gatley and Cheadle is not too far from the country as a whole. Most notable is the relatively high Jewish population, over ten times higher than the English and Stockport averages. This is reflected in the existence of Gatley's orthodox synagogue, the Menorah reform synagogue in neighbouring Sharston and the North Cheshire Jewish Primary School in Heald Green.

The Muslim population is higher than the average across England and similar to neighbouring Didsbury. Bangladeshi make up the majority of this group.

The data in the table refers to the Cheadle and Gatley ward. The data comes from the 2001 UK census, when the ward name was Cheadle and the ward encompassed the whole of Gatley and a large part of Cheadle village. Gatley has never been an administrative district in its own right and no data for Gatley alone exists.

Ethnicity

The data in the table refers to the Cheadle and Gatley ward. The data comes from the 2001 UK census, when the ward name was Cheadle and the ward encompassed the whole of Gatley and a large part of Cheadle village. Gatley has never been an administrative district in its own right and no data for Gatley alone exists.

Economy and employment
Gatley's primary commercial area covers Church Road, Stonepail Road, Gatley Road, Northenden Road and Old Hall Road. Here there are over 40 shops, 10 take-aways, 8 hairdressers, 4 beauty salons, 5 restaurants, 2 pubs, 4 cafes, a bike shop and significant office space and additional units. Gatley has three smaller areas of local shops on Pendlebury Road, Foxland Road and Silverdale Road, each with between two and six commercial premises.

There are also three small-medium-sized office blocks (on Northenden Road, Park Road and Stonepail Road) which house various businesses.

Roads and transport
The River Mersey was not bridged in this area until 1745 (and then not continuously as three bridges collapsed over the years) so travelling to Didsbury meant fording the Mersey or crossing in a boat. Until the railway in 1864, the road from Didsbury to Gatley (and then onto Styal) forded the Mersey and came through Gatley Carrs. The "Gatley Ford" was near Didsbury's Millgate Lane, suggesting the river was forded somewhere near the current M60/M56 motorway junction.

Turnpikes opened across Stockport from 1725, with the road through Gatley being amongst the last, in 1820. This was the main road through Cheadle, Gatley, Altrincham and Northwich. By July 1822, the fast coach along the road from Stockport to Liverpool via Warrington made it possible to spend six hours in Liverpool and return on the same day.

Gatley had no public transport until 1896, when a postmaster started a cab service. In 1898 Mr Potts began to operate a service to Stockport with a single (horse drawn) omnibus, continuing until the arrival of the electric tram in 1904. Electric trams began to run in Stockport in 1902, with the service to Gatley (terminating at the Horse and Farrier) opening in March 1904. In Gatley, trams were replaced by buses in 1931. The trams were not wholly reliable: broken rear axles were common and the trams often disengaged from the electric cable. Bus 11A runs between Altrincham and Stockport, via Timperley, Baguley, Gatley and Cheadle.

The LWNR railway station at Cheadle allowed travel via Edgeley to Manchester, but closed as early as 1917 due to competition with the electric tram between Gatley and Stockport. LWNR opened the Styal Line in 1909 including Gatley (as Gatley for Cheadle until 1974) and Heald Green railway stations.

The M56 and M63 (now the M60) were opened in 1974, bypassing Gatley and joining with each other at Kingsway (Kingsway having been extended south across the River Mersey in 1959).

The Manchester Metrolink was extended to Manchester Airport in 2014, including Benchill stop, which is approx one mile from Gatley.

Education
Gatley has three nurseries, two primary schools (Gatley and Lum Head), and one secondary school (The Kingsway School). The schools are in the state sector.

Gatley Primary School
Situated on Hawthorn Road, it has approximately 460 pupils aged 5–11, and got an overall "outstanding" rating by Ofsted in 2010.

Lum Head Primary School
Lum Head Primary School (previously Lum Head Junior School) is situated in Troutbeck Road. It was opened on 1 September 1965 and it comes under the Stockport Metropolitan Borough. It has approximately 200 pupils in the age range 4–11. It was given an overall "good" rating by Ofsted in 2011.

High Grove Infant School
High Grove Infant School was situated in Grasmere Road and opened in 1968? as the Infant School for Lum Head Primary School as the number of 5-11 year olds in the area increased with the building of new housing estates. It closed in 19xx? and was replaced by residential houses on Kentmere Close.

The Kingsway School
The Kingsway School was formed in 1983 following the merger of Broadway Boys School and Kingsway Girls School. It is now a mixed school specialising in mathematics, computing and science. It is situated on two sites, Foxland Road in Gatley and Broadway in Cheadle, on opposite sides of the A34 road (Kingsway), linked by a pedestrian subway. The school was rated "good" by OFSTED in 2013.

Landmarks and park areas

War memorial and clock tower
Gatley's war memorial is situated on Gatley Green, though the original First World War memorial is the clock tower at the junction of Northenden Road and Church Road. Following many years of in-operation, a clock fund was started in 2011 with the intention of repairing and restoring the clock tower and clock. In mid-2012 work began on restoration, with completion in late 2012. The fully restored clock tower now boasts a fully working clock, however, its four faces are no longer illuminated at night.

Tatton Cinema (frontage)
There is also what remains of the Tatton Cinema, which was built in the 1930s. The Tatton Cinema opened in 1937 with just one screen; in the 1960s, a second, smaller screen was added, known as Tatton Minor in cinema listings, with the main auditorium known as Tatton Major; by the 1970s it had been converted into a three screen cinema. In 2005, the auditoriums (situated at the rear of the building) were demolished leaving only the front facade and foyer area still standing. There have been plans to turn the old cinema into a supermarket outlet but development was held up due to the 2008 recession. By 2010, two planning applications had been placed to build sheltered housing on the vacant land where the auditoriums were and to create a supermarket at the front. The first supermarket plan envisaged the demolition of half of the facade and the building of a modern edifice to the same scale. The second supermarket plan envisaged the conversion of the same half of the facade. Both planning applications met with opposition (from established local retailers and councillors) and were rejected. In 2015, after years of inaction at the now derelict site, Stockport Council announced plans to acquire the site from its present owners by means of a compulsory purchase order. In August 2015, the current owners, Dickens Property Group, then submitted a new planning application for a supermarket and residential buildings at the site, similar to the plans previously submitted but this time maintaining all of the art deco front facade while demolishing the adjoining buildings and constructing new ones in their place. The plans were accepted by the council, though in October 2015, the council also agreed upon issuing a compulsory purchase order should the planned development not proceed. Work finally began in 2018 and, almost 20 years after the Tatton Cinema closed, a new Co-op supermarket finally opened on the site in November 2020.

Gatley Recreation Ground
Gatley Recreation Ground (informally known as Gatley Park) is a small park area between Church Road and Northenden Road. It has a bowling green, a hard-surface tennis and basketball court, a children's playground area and a purpose-built skateboarding area with several ramps. Maintenance of the park is the responsibility of Stockport Council and a local community group called SPRING (Supporters of Parks and Recreation IN Gatley) support the council by fundraising, enabling continued investment in park facilities.

Walter Stansby Memorial Park

Walter Stansby Memorial Park is a small tree-lined park area running between Church Road and Northenden Road, near to the Recreation Ground (the two are separated by a children's day nursery). In contrast to the Recreation Ground, it has been designed to be a tranquil nature spot with tended lawns and plants, several memorial benches, and a path that extends through the park.

Scholes Park
At the south-western end of the village, close to the boundary of Manchester, is Gatley Hill House, next to which is the William Scholes Park which includes several large playing fields partitioned by small woodland areas. Far larger than Gatley Recreation Ground, this was developed in the early 1960s with money from the William Scholes Foundation. Scholes was a Gatley resident and estate agent who died in 1927. The track circuit opened on 19 May 1962 and was the first home of Cheadle and Gatley Athletics Club, before it merged with Stretford Athletics Club in 1966. Currently, the fields are used for many Gatley events – from the annual Gatley Festival to Sport Relief – and are used regularly by local running clubs as well as local teams for cricket in the summer and football in the winter. A children's playground was opened in February 2011 at the Foxland Road corner.

Gatley Carrs Nature Reserve
Gatley Carrs is a local nature reserve at the north-west corner of the area (bounded to the north and west by the M56 motorway and the Stockport-Altrincham railway line). A local community group, the Gatley Carrs Conservation Group, help to maintain the reserve in conjunction with the local authority.

Culture

Gatley Festival
Gatley Festival is an annual summer event. It is a celebration of village life and includes a carnival parade and a family fun day which are held on the first Sunday in July each year.

The festival is believed to have started in the early 1930s as the Gatley Rose Queen Parade. The current festival format of a large parade and then a funfair and stalls was started around 1986 and was originally held in what is now known as Gatley Recreation Ground before moving to the much larger Scholes Park next to Gatley Hill House. The festival still maintains the tradition of crowning a rose queen.

Gatley Music Festival
Gatley Music Festival is a non-profit annual event bringing live music to the village of Gatley, while at the same time raising money for local charities. It runs in March for one week each year with something for every age and taste, including classical, jazz, brass, choral as well as local indie, acoustic and rock. It has its roots in "Music at St James", set up in 1989 by the Rev. Brian Lee (curate of St James in Gatley) and Len Mather. The success of those concerts inspired the establishment of a festival of music in 2005.

See also

Listed buildings in Cheadle and Gatley

References

Geography of the Metropolitan Borough of Stockport
Areas of Greater Manchester
Local Nature Reserves in Greater Manchester